William Ayerst Ingram or W. Ayerst Ingram RBA (27 April 1855 Twickenham, Surrey – 20 March 1913 Falmouth, Cornwall) was a painter and member of the Newlyn School. He did notable Landscape art and Marine art. In 1906 he joined the Royal Institute of Oil Painters and in 1907 he joined the Royal Institute of Painters in Water Colours.

Personal life and education
William Ayerst Ingram was born on 27 April 1855 in Twickenham, Middlesex, England. His father, Rev G. S. Ingram, was born in Glasgow, Scotland  and served as the minister of Twickenham Congregational Church 1854-1864 and Vineyard Congregational Church, Richmond, Surrey 1864-1888.
Ingram was the third son born to Reverend G.S. Ingram and his mother. It was first accepted that William would become a businessman, so it was later in his life that he began exploring artistic pursuits by studying with A.W. Weedon and John Steeple.

In 1882 Ingram moved to the Cornwall town of Falmouth. He married May Martha Fay, an American, by 1896. The couple lived in Tregurrian in Falmouth in 1911. Ingram died on 20 March 1913 in Falmouth.

Career
He set up a studio in Chelsea, London. The same year he also founded the Anglo-Australian Society and was established as its President. By this time Ingram had well-travelled, including travels to Australia, according to a fellow artist and friend, George Percy Jacomb-Hood. He became the Royal British Colonial Society of Artists' President in 1888.

Having moved to Cornwall in 1882, Ingram established friendships with people from the Newlyn School, including Laura and Harold Knight.

In 1894 Ingram and two good friends Jack Downing and Henry Scott Tuke established the Falmouth Art Gallery. From 1902 to 1904 Ingram was the Royal Cornwall Polytechnic Society's Vice-President in Falmouth. His works for 1893 A P. & O. Voyage and 1902 Waters of the Old and New Worlds exhibits reflected his world-wide travel experiences. A Saturday Review of A P. & O. Voyage stated that Ingram was adroit at capturing the "convexity" of the sea waves, but fell short in capturing the reality of some of the scenes, such as of the Australian coast, which "for the most part is incredibly monotonous both in colour and scenery..."

Works
Ingram's works included outdoor scenes, such as seascapes and landscapes, generally in oil and watercolour. A partial list of Ingram's work is:

 A Highland Landscape With Figures Near A Loch, watercolour
 A Noontime Rest, watercolour
 A Sailing Ship at Sea, watercolour
 A Snow Covered Forest, watercolour
 A Tidal Harbour, oil
 An English Two Mast Top Sail Schooner Off Falmouth, watercolour
 At Anchor, oil
 Cockle Gatherers, watercolour
 Falmouth, watercolour
 Falmouth Bay, bodycolour and watercolour
 Falmouth Harbour, watercolour
 Falmouth Town from the Water
 Fishing boat in the Hayle estuary
 HM Training Ship 'Ganges' Uploading Grain – Falmouth
 Holyloch Argyllshire, oil
 Horse And Cart On Beach
 Loch Ranua Castle, oil
 Moored Alongside in a River Estuary, watercolour
 Morphets
 Mussel gathering at Low Tide
 Newlyn Harbour, 1884
 Restronguet Point and Feock
 Sailing Boats In A Choppy Sea, watercolour
 Sailing Boats Off The Cornish Coast, watercolour
 Sailing Ship At Sea
 Sailing Ship at Sea with Ghost Freighter, oil
 Seascape With Sailing Vessel In Foreground, watercolour
 Ship At First Light, oil
 Ship of the Line under Tow
 Shipping
 Ships at Sea, watercolour
 Still Life With Ducks, A Basket Of Fruit And A Pot On A Ledge
 The End of the Voyage, 1894, oil
 The First Flood, oil
 The Harbour Under the Hill, 1880, pencil and watercolor
 The Home Port, Falmouth, 1912
 The Return of the Herring Boats, watercolour
 The Rising Moon, oil
 The Seaweed Gatherer, watercolour
 The Wreck, watercolour
 Trawler Becalmed Off Torquay, watercolour
 Trawlers at Tenby, 1889
 Whitby, watercolour
 Yachts Becalmed, watercolour

His works, which have been compared to those of the painter Henry Moore and are in the collections of the Art Gallery of New South Wales, Art Gallery of South Australia; Public Galleries in Otago, New Zealand and Bendigo, Victoria and the Guildhall Art Gallery, London.

Memberships
Ingram was a member and Vice-President or President of some of the following organisations:

 Anglo-Australian Society – Founder and President
 Royal British Colonial Society of Artists – 1888 President
 Royal Cornwall Polytechnic Society, Falmouth (RCPS) – 1901–03, Vice-President 1902–04
 Royal Institute of Painters in Water Colours – 1907
 Royal Institute of Oil Painters – 1906
 Royal Society of British Artists
 Royal Society of Painter-Etchers

Exhibitions
Ingram exhibited at Dowdeswells, Royal Academy, Royal Society of British Artists, Whitechapel, NWS in 1886 and the Fine Art Society in 1888 and 1902.

Gallery

Notes

References

Further reading
 Harold Begbie. The life of General William Booth: the founder of the Salvation army. The Macmillan company; 1920. p. 303. Note: Sweet story of William Ayerst and his wife being moved by a Salvation Army worker when they lived in Falmouth.
 Charles Holme; Guy Eglinton; Peyton Boswell. International Studio. New York Offices of the International Studio; 1900. p. 271. Note: description of one of his works.
 Cornwall Polytechnic Society. Annual report. 1905.
 George Percy Jacomb Hood. With Brush and Pencil. J. Murray; 1925.

External links

 William Ayerst Ingram, images of works

19th-century English painters
English male painters
20th-century English painters
People from Twickenham
Newlyn School of Artists
1855 births
1913 deaths
20th-century English male artists
19th-century English male artists